Ted Cook (1901–1957) was an association football player who represented New Zealand, playing in New Zealand's first ever official international.

Cook made his full All Whites debut in New Zealand's inaugural A-international fixture and had the distinction of scoring New Zealand's first goal, scoring a brace in that game, with Bill Knott scoring the other in a 3–1 win over Australia on 17 June 1922. He played in all three of New Zealand's internationals in June that year, scoring in each game for a total of three A-international caps and four goals.

Following his football career, Ted immigrated to Australia where he went on to be the General Manager of the Commercial Bank of Australia from<History of and Australian Institution 1866-1981 the Commercial Bank of Australia> 1953–1957.

References

External links
 

New Zealand association footballers
New Zealand international footballers
Association football forwards
1901 births
1957 deaths